The Maritime Services Board was a statutory authority of the Government of New South Wales responsible for marine safety, regulation of commercial and recreational boating and oversight of port operations.

History
The Maritime Services Board (MSB) was established on 1 February 1936 taking over the functions of the Department of Navigation and Sydney Harbour Trust. Originally headquartered at Circular Quay, in December 1952 the MSB moved to the Maritime Services Board Building on George Street.

In 1989, the MSB moved to the Maritime Trade Towers on Kent Street. On 30 June 1995 the MSB was disbanded with its functions taken over by the Waterways Authority.

References

External links
 The Maritime Services Board of New South Wales,  Wiley Online Library
 Maritime Services Board, State Records Authority of New South Wales
 Sydney Heritage Fleet, The Maritime Services Board of NSW
 History: Port Authority of New South Wales
 Documents Related to Maritime Services Board of New South Wales, Caroline Simpson Library & Research Collection

Defunct government entities of New South Wales
1936 establishments in Australia
1995 disestablishments in Australia